The Großes Schauspielhaus (Great Theater) was a theatre in Berlin, Germany, often described as an example of expressionist architecture, designed by Hans Poelzig for theatre impresario Max Reinhardt. The structure was originally a market built by architect Friedrich Hitzig, and it retained its external, gabled form. It then became the Zirkus Schumann, a circus arena. It was renovated by Poelzig and reopened in 1919, contained seating for 3500 people. Max Reinhardt wanted to attract a working-class audience. The large size allowed for people who could pay top prices for the best seats to support low-cost seats, in the back of the theater.

Painted red, it was a cavernous, domed space and had no balconies, which contributed to its vastness. Its dome and the pillars were decorated with Muqarnas, a honeycombed pendentive ornament, which resembled stalactites. When illuminated, the ceiling's lightbulbs formed patterns of celestial constellations, and the vaulted ceiling took on another concept, the night sky. In the lobby and elsewhere, Poelzig used coloured lightbulbs to create striking visual backdrops. Separate entrances were provided for the expensive and the cheap seats. The theatre also included a restaurant for the wealthy audience members, a cafeteria for the poorer audience members, and a bar. The performers and technicians enjoyed their own bar, a barber shop, ample dressing room space, and the modern stage equipment.

The Nazis took over in 1933 and changed its name to Theatre of the People. They described the building as an example of Entartete Kunst and refurbished its interior by adding a hung ceiling to hide the stalactite forms. After World War II, it was used for variety shows under the name of Friedrichstadt-Palast until 1988, when it was condemned and demolished. There was a strong subsidence of the foundation and moulding of the supporting piles.

The new Friedrichstadt-Palast has been erected on Friedrichstraße 107.

References 

 

Theatres completed in 1919
Expressionist architecture
Hans Poelzig buildings
Modernist architecture in Germany
Theatres in Berlin
Buildings and structures demolished in 1988